Government Street is the name given to portions of U.S. Route 90 (US 90) and US 98 within the city limits of Mobile, Alabama. It is known as Government Boulevard west of Pinehill Drive, and as Government Street east of it. It is the most important road on Mobile's far south side and is the only nominally east–west road on Mobile's south side to enter the city from outside the western city limits and reach the downtown business district. The only other two east–west thoroughfares in the city to do so are Moffett Road/Springhill Avenue and Old Shell Road. Government Street is a four-lane highway throughout the city limits, from Water Street to the western city limits. It is the only thoroughfare in Mobile to have interchanges with both Interstate 10 (I-10) and I-65 within the city limits.

Route description
Government Street begins at the intersection with the Old Spanish Trail on Blakeley Island, east of where it emerges from the Bankhead Tunnel. It expands after crossing Royal Street. US 98 leaves the route at Broad Street, with the remainder of Government Street continuing as US 90. It then continues for approximately  until it ends at the southwesternmost limits of the city, in Theodore. This area, along with the Tillmans Corner business district, was annexed into the city in September 2008.

History

The street was laid out and named after the close of Mobile's colonial era, following the demolition of the obsolete Fort Conde.  In the early 1820s the marshlands between the Mobile River and Royal Street were filled in with the bricks and other material from the demolished fort. Government Street was run westward from the old esplanade that had been situated beside the river and fort.  It has traditionally been a street where Mobile's government-related functions were concentrated. Barton Academy, Old City Hall, the Mobile County License Commissioner Offices, Mobile Government Plaza, the Mobile Public Library, Mobile Bar Association, and Social Security Administration all continue to lie along Government Street.

Government had a reputation as the "mansion or millionaire's row" in the city, although many of the largest and grandest of the 19th-century mansions once lining the street were demolished as late as the 1980s. The area east of Houston Street still has many 19th- to early 20th-century mansions that date back to the time when Government was the most prestigious address that one could have in Mobile.

See also

U.S. Route 90 in Alabama
U.S. Route 98 in Alabama
Kennedy House (Mobile, Alabama)

References

Streets in Mobile, Alabama
U.S. Route 90
U.S. Route 98